Count Ludwig von Salm-Hoogstraeten (24 February 1885 – 23 July 1944), nicknamed "Ludi", was an Austrian tennis player of the pre-Open Era. He competed in the men's outdoor singles event at the 1912 Summer Olympics. He reached the quarterfinal in which he lost to South African Harold Kitson in straight sets.

Salm-Hoogstraeten played in six ties for the Austrian Davis Cup team between 1924 and 1928 and compiled a record of four wins and eight losses.

Early life and family
Count Salm was born on 24 February 1885 in Bad Homburg vor der Höhe to Count Alfred von Salm-Hoogstraeten, a Prussian cavalry officer in the Franco-Prussian War, and Baroness Adolphine von Erlanger. He had three brothers, Alfred, Otto and Alexander. The latter two were also tennis players and formed a doubles team, were Austrian champions and competed in the 1914 US Indoor Championships. His family held an estate at Reichenau, and as the oldest child, he was the first in line to inherit it.

Tennis career

1910–1914
Ludwig von Salm was particularly successful in doubles competitions. His pre-World War I career included a mixed final in the Les Avants tournament with Miss Turner, which he lost to Eric Pockley and Miss Brook-Smith. In April 1911 he won the San Remo doubles together with Anthony Wilding after defeating the German duo of Curt Bergmann and Friedrich Rahe. The same month they split for the Croquet et Lawn-Tennis Club de Cannes championships, Wilding played with A. Wallis Myers, Salm chose Robert Kleinschroth, and the four of them met in the semifinal, which was won by Wilding and Myers. In 1912 he was a singles runner-up for the Biarritz Golf Club tournament, losing to Rahe; however, he was still successful in doubles, winning the inaugural Russian Championships doubles pairing with home favorite Mikhail Sumarokov-Elston. In 1913, he was a doubles semifinalist in the Monaco tournament with French netman Max Decugis but ceded the victory to Kleinschroth and Rahe in a straight two-set match. In 1914, pairing again with Wilding, they clinched the Cannes doubles title by beating Decugis and Gordon Lowe. At Nice, Wilding and Craig Biddle defeated Salm and Gordon Lowe. The same year, he was the finalist for the World Hard Court Championships mixed doubles and the French Championships doubles. In the former with Suzanne Lenglen, he was routed by Elizabeth Ryan and Max Decugis. In the latter, he and William Laurentz fell in the challenge round to title defenders Max Decugis and Maurice Germot.

Although he only reached the second round of the Wimbledon singles in 1913, he did better in the All England Plate, a consolation tournament for losing participants, where he was eliminated by Horace Rice in the fourth round. In 1914, Salm achieved his biggest achievement in the French Championships by advancing to the All Comers' final of the tournament, where he was forced to give up the contest to Jean Samazeuilh at the fifth set due to fatigue.
A week later he reached the final of the World Hard Court Championships, losing to Anthony Wilding in straight sets.

1920–1930, on-court controversies
After the war, he made his comeback at the 1920 German International Tennis Championships, winning the doubles title with Oscar Kreuzer. In 1924, the French Riviera tennis clubs refused him entry to their championships for his lack of sportsmanship. In 1925, his playing license was suspended by the Austrian Lawn Tennis Federation for failing to show up at an international match in Breslau (this ban was lifted a couple of years later). During that season, he violated the attitude code on several occasions. In a Viennese doubles match, he insulted his recurring partner Suzanne Lenglen to the point that she dropped her racquet and quit the match. He also provoked Irish player Charles Scroope in a Davis Cup meeting by constantly questioning the umpire's decisions.

In 1926, he reached the quarterfinals of the French International Hard Court Championship partnering Béla von Kehrling; they were defeated by eventual victors Howard Kinsey and Vincent Richards. Also in 1926, he won the Rot-Weiss Tennis Club of Berlin tournament, a victory which caused a major scandal. Count Salm verbally abused his 18-old opponent Herman Wetzel, who then walked off the court in the second set. The judges overruled the first decision and awarded the match to Salm, reasoning that Wetzel had voluntarily left the court. It was the second time within a year that Salm's misbehavior stirred international controversy, and as a result, an official ban was requested to deny him access to tournaments. On another occasion in 1928, while he was participating in the mixed doubles at Cannes, he drew attention when he walked off the court in outrage during a match after a ball flew in from outside, distracting him so that he lost the point. He came back when he heard the laughter of the spectators. His partner, Blanche Gladys Duddell, wife of Edward Murray Colston, 2nd Baron Roundway, was \upset by the count's actions, and her husband officially protested during this interruption to ensure that the rules prevented the count from leaving the court again.

In 1928 at New Courts Club tournament in Cannes, Salm partnered with Austrian champion Hermann von Artens and won the doubles without losing a set.  In 1929, the Austrian team pushed to the semifinals of the South of France Championships, where they were stopped by René Gallèpe and Charles Aeschlimann. In 1930, he claimed the Austrian International Championships doubles, teaming up with eventual world number one Bill Tilden. He was also runner-up in Ostend, Venice, and Merano with three different partners. In 1931, he earned a second place at the veterans' singles of the French Championships granting a flawless two straight sets victory to Briton Leighton Crawford.

Personal life and death
During World War I, Count von Salm-Hoogstraeten served as a dragoon officer in the Austrian Army and as a military aide to the governor of Vienna. After the war he settled in Vienna, where he lost much of his fortune and properties over card games held at the Jockey Club. He married his first wife, Anne-Marie von Kramsta, on 30 June 1909. His second marriage, on 8 January 1924, was to American heiress Millicent Rogers and produced one son, but the couple had divorced before he was born. Apart from playing tennis, he occasionally acted in movies because his friend Count Alexander Kolowrat, who was a film producer and owner of Sascha-Film. His director Mihály Kertész encouraged Kolowrat to offer Salm movie roles and hire him.

He was cast in three feature films alongside Lucy Doraine, including the  Masters of the Sea and A Vanished World. In 1929, he published a book dedicated to his son, Peter, titled Mein lieber Peter ... beichte eines vaters. While living in Austria, he gave private tennis etiquette and fair-play lessons to Viennese children. After his financial breakdown, Salm moved to Budapest and started a wine business. He rented and lived in a second-story room in the Hotel Dunapalota-Ritz.

On 23 July 1944, he jumped off the hotel balcony onto the Danube Promenade and died immediately. According to the Winona Daily News, he did so because the Nazis had arrived on the scene to arrest him for his Jewish ancestry. According to his friend Sidney Wood, the root cause behind his suicide was that the Nazi regime pressured him to engage in espionage, which he refused to do and thus the SS wanted to hunt him down. On the contrary, according to the Jewish Criterion, he was a Nazi collaborator and avid anti-Semite and chose to end his life in fear of post-war reprisals. He was buried on 28 July; his funeral became social affair.

Ancestry

See also
Salm Island
Hoogstraten

Footnotes

Works cited

Online media

Books

Periodicals

External links
 
 
 
 
 
 

1885 births
1944 suicides
Austrian male tennis players
Austrian male silent film actors
Olympic tennis players of Austria
Tennis players at the 1912 Summer Olympics
People from Bad Homburg vor der Höhe
Sportspeople from Darmstadt (region)
Counts of Belgium
Suicides by jumping in Hungary
Ludwig
20th-century Austrian male actors
1944 deaths
Austro-Hungarian military personnel of World War I